Albert Anderson (born October 11, 1950) is an American-born songwriter and guitarist.

Anderson grew up in Montclair, New Jersey and attended Montclair High School where he learned to play the trombone, eventually picking up guitar & bass guitar. He later attended the Berklee College of Music contemporaneously with Pat Metheny and Al Di Meola after working with an early version of Aerosmith in the Boston music scene. He joined The Centurions, which brought him to the attention of Chris Wood of Traffic, who invited him to play on the band's next album. The Traffic album involvement never materialized, but led to Anderson becoming employed by Traffic's record label Island Records, leading to him being asked to play lead guitar on Bob Marley & The Wailers' Natty Dread sessions. Anderson played lead guitar on "Crazy Baldhead" and on the Live! album, remaining with the band until 1976, when he joined Word, Sound and Power, backing Peter Tosh on the albums Legalize It and Equal Rights. He returned to Marley's band and played on the live album Babylon By Bus and the studio albums Survival and Uprising. After Marley's death, Anderson continued to tour with The Wailers Band. Anderson went on to record with Ben Harper (Diamonds On the Inside (2003)) and Lauryn Hill on her multi-Grammy winning debut The Miseducation of Lauryn Hill (1998). He also produced and performed on an album for actor Steven Seagal (Songs from the Crystal Cave (2005)). In 2008 he formed the band The Original Wailers with Junior Marvin.

Tours with Bob Marley & The Wailers
 Jun–Jul 1975: Natty Dread Tour (U.S., Canada, England)
 May–Aug 1978: Kaya Tour (U.S., Canada, England, France, Spain, Sweden, Denmark, Norway, Netherlands, Belgium)
 Apr–May 1979: Babylon by Bus Tour (Japan, New Zealand, Australia, Hawaii)
 Oct–Dec 1979: Survival Tour (U.S., Canada, Trinidad & Tobago, Bahamas)
 May–Sep 1980: Uprising Tour (Switzerland, Germany, France, Norway, Sweden, Denmark, Belgium, Netherlands, Italy, Spain, Ireland, England, Scotland, Wales, U.S.)

References

1950 births
Living people
American reggae guitarists
American male guitarists
American rock guitarists
Montclair High School (New Jersey) alumni
People from Montclair, New Jersey
The Wailers members
Berklee College of Music alumni
Guitarists from New York (state)
20th-century American guitarists